Guy Doleman (22 November 1923 – 30 January 1996) was a New Zealand born actor, active in Australia, Britain and the United States.

Early life
Doleman was born in Hamilton, Waikato, New Zealand, later moving to Australia.

Career
During the 1940s and '50s, Doleman was one of the busiest actors in Australia, appearing in the majority of films made there at the time, and being busy on radio, particularly in the drama Hagen's Circus, which made him a radio star in Australia. Radio historian Peter Philp grouped Doleman with Peter Finch, Grant Taylor, Rod Taylor and Lloyd Berrell as part of "a wild but very colourful group of actors... who in their own way helped forge a wonderful ambience which was unique to Sydney radio."

In 1952 he won a £300 Actor's Choice Award for his performance in the radio drama The Coward. He used this money to go to Hollywood for a film in September 1953, where he tested for some films.

He was cast in Long John Silver (1954) but passed on the role because it meant he had to wear contact lenses – Rod Taylor took the part instead. He had moved to London by the early 1960s. Later he returned to Australia.

He is perhaps best known for his role as "Count Lippe" in the James Bond film Thunderball (1965) and as "Colonel Ross" in the three film adaptations of Len Deighton's Harry Palmer novels, starring Michael Caine, released between 1965 and 1967. He also played Number Two in the TV series The Prisoner (1967). Doleman's was the first of a pair of Number Twos who appeared in the first episode, "Arrival"; the second being played by George Baker.

Death
Guy Doleman died of lung cancer in Los Angeles on 30 January 1996 aged 72.

Filmography

Always Another Dawn (1948) – Warren Melville
Strong Is the Seed (1949) – William Farrer
The Kangaroo Kid (1950) – Sgt. Jim Penrose
Kangaroo (1952) – Pleader (uncredited)
The Phantom Stockman (1953) – Mr. Stapleton
His Majesty O'Keefe (1954) – Herr Weber
Dial M for Murder (1954) – Detective (uncredited)
Smiley (1956) – Bill McVitty
The Adventures of Long John Silver (1957, TV Series) – Dr. Stanhope
The Shiralee (1957) – Son O'Neill
Smiley Gets a Gun (1958) – Quirk
On the Beach (1959) – Lt. Cmdr. Farrel
The Grey Nurse Said Nothing (1960, TV Movie)
The Square Ring (1960, TV Movie)
Whiplash (1961, TV Series) – Sundowner / Raike Dartner / Norris
Follow the Sun (1961, TV Series) – Alex Cooper
ITV Play of the Week (1962-1963, TV Series) – Walter Ramsden / Captain Lee
No Hiding Place (1962-1964, TV Series) – Melvyn Kerry / Felix Seymour / James Conway
The Avengers (1963, TV Series) – Oliver Waldner
Jezebel ex UK (1963, TV Series) – Robin Coleridge
Captain Sindbad (1963)
The Dickie Henderson Show (1963, TV Series)
BBC Sunday-Night Play (1963, TV Series) – Managing Editor
The Edgar Wallace Mystery Theatre (1963, TV Series) – Wayne Douglas
The Hidden Truth (1964, TV Series) – Charles Medwin
The System (1964) (aka: The Girl Getters) – Philip
Boy with a Flute (1965, Short)
Young Cassidy (1965) – Officer
The Ipcress File (1965) – Colonel Ross
Thunderball (1965) – Count Lippe
The Idol (1966) – Martin Livesey
The Power Game (1966, TV Series) – Stephen Gray
Funeral in Berlin (1966) – Colonel Ross
The Deadly Bees (1967) – Ralph Hargrove
The Prisoner (1967, Episode: "Arrival") – Number Two
Thirty-Minute Theatre (1967, Episode: "The Tape Recorder")
Billion Dollar Brain (1967) – Colonel Ross
A Twist of Sand (1968) – Patrol Boat Commander
Strange Report (1969, TV Series) – Glyn Crowley
Chilling (1974)
The Six Million Dollar Man (1977, TV Series) – Henry Bulman
Enigma (1977) – Maurice Mockcastle
The Greatest Battle (1978) – General Whitmore
A Dangerous Summer (1981) – Julian Fane
Early Frost (1982) – Mike Hayes
Goodbye Paradise (1983) – Quiney 
Matt Houston (1984, TV Series) – Richard / Rudy Bezmer (Episode: Eyewitness)
The Colbys (1986, TV Series) – Peter Hackford
The Shiralee (1987)
Hell Raiders (1988)
Tagget (1991, TV Movie) – Commander Arthur Green
Murder, She Wrote (1992, TV Series) – Corsair (final appearance)

Theatre Credits
Little Lambs Eat Ivy, Minerva Theatre, Kings Cross, NSW, May 1949
Edward, My Son, Theatre Royal, Sydney, NSW, 16 September 1949
All for Mary national tour 1956-57
The Piccadilly Bushman national tour Sept 1959 – Feb 1960

Select Radio Credits
The Coward (1952)
Chips (1954)
The Orchard Walls (1954)

References

External links 
 
 Guy Doleman Australian theatre credits at AusStage
Guy Doleman at National Film and Sound Archive

1923 births
1996 deaths
20th-century New Zealand male actors
Deaths from lung cancer in California
New Zealand male film actors
New Zealand male television actors
People from Hamilton, New Zealand
New Zealand emigrants to Australia